Randai (Jawi: رنداي) is a folk theater tradition of the Minangkabau ethnic group in West Sumatra, Indonesia, which incorporates music, singing, dance, drama and the martial art of silat. Randai is usually performed for traditional ceremonies and festivals, and complex stories may span a number of nights. It is performed as a theatre-in-the-round to achieve an equality and unity between audience members and the performers. Randai performances are a synthesis of alternating martial arts dances, songs, and acted scenes. Stories are delivered by both the acting and the singing and are mostly based upon Minangkabau legends and folktales. Randai originated early in the 20th century out of fusion of local martial arts, story-telling and other performance traditions. Men originally played both the male and female characters in the story, but since the 1960s women have also participated.

Gallery

See also

 Piring dance
 Pencak silat

References

Further reading

Theatrical genres
Theatre in Indonesia
Traditional drama and theatre of Indonesia
Articles containing video clips
Minangkabau dance